Nymphicula beni is a moth in the family Crambidae. It was described by David John Lawrence Agassiz in 2014. It is found in Papua New Guinea.

The wingspan is about 15 mm. The basal two-thirds of costa of the forewings is brown and the base is brownish. The subbasal fascia is white and the antemedian fascia orange. The median area is scattered with brown scales. The base of the hindwings is white, mixed with pale fuscous and a silver-grey tornus, as well as a yellow streak and a white antemedian fascia, edged with brown.

Etymology
The species is named for Mr Ben Probert.

References

Nymphicula
Moths described in 2014